Paltinu may refer to:

Villages 
 Paltinu, in Negomir Commune, Gorj County, Romania
 Paltinu, in Vatra Moldoviței Commune, Suceava County, Romania

Rivers 
 Paltinu, a tributary of the Bâsca Mică in Buzău County, Romania
 Paltinu, a tributary of the Prahova in Prahova County, Romania

See also 
 Paltin (disambiguation)
 Păltiniș (disambiguation)
 Păltinișu (disambiguation)